Turpinia malabarica is an endemic tree species of the Western Ghats.

References

External links

Staphyleaceae